Sean Murray (born 5 May 1997) is an Irish field hockey player who plays as a midfielder for Belgian Hockey League club Gantoise and the Irish national team.

He represented Ireland at the 2018 Men's Hockey World Cup. At club level, he was a member of the Lisnagarvey team that won the 2015–16 Men's Irish Hockey League title.

Early years, family and education
Murray was educated at Wallace High School and at Queen's University Belfast, where he gained a maths degree. His father, Mark Murray, is involved with Lisnagarvey Hockey Club in various roles including as a coach, and his older siblings, Laura and Stephen and younger brother Daniel are also field hockey players.

Domestic teams

Wallace High School
In 2013–14 Murray was a member of the Wallace High School team that won a  McCullough Cup/Burney Cup double. Murray scored in both finals. He also played for Wallace High School in the 2014 All Ireland Schoolboys Hockey Championship final, when they lost 3–1 to St. Andrew's College. He also played in the 2014–15 McCullough Cup final. He captained Wallace High School when they retained the Burney Cup in 2014–15. While playing for Wallace High School, Murray also represented
Ulster U18 at inter-provincial level.

Lisnagarvey
During the 2014–15 season, Murray became an established member of the Lisnagarvey first team. In 2015–16, along with Jonathan Bell, Michael Watt and Paul Gleghorne, Murray was a member of the Lisnagarvey team that won the Men's Irish Hockey League and the EY Champions Trophy. Murray and Lisnagarvey also reached the final of the Irish Senior Cup but lost to Monkstown after a penalty shoot-out. Murray also played and scored for Lisnagarvey in the 2016–17 Euro Hockey League.

Playing abroad
In 2018 Murray began playing for HC Rotterdam in the Dutch Hoofdklasse. After two seasons he left Rotterdam for Leuven in Belgium. At Leuven he also only stayed for two seasons and left them in 2022 for Gantoise.

Ireland international
Murray made his senior debut for Ireland in October 2015 in a 2–2 draw with Argentina. He has previously represented Ireland at under-18 and under-21 levels. In March 2017 Murray helped Ireland win a 2016–17 Men's FIH Hockey World League Round 2 tournament. In June 2017 Murray was also a member of the Ireland team that won the Hamburg Masters, defeating Germany 4–2 in the final.

Honours
Ireland
Hamburg Masters
Winners: 2017
Men's FIH Hockey World League Round 2
Winners: 2017 Belfast
Men's FIH Series Finals
Runners up: 2019 Le Touquet
Lisnagarvey
Men's Irish Hockey League
Winners: 2015–16
EY Champions Trophy
Winners: 2016
Irish Senior Cup
Runners up: 2015–16
Wallace High School
All Ireland Schoolboys Hockey Championship
Runners up: 2014
Burney Cup
Winners: 2014, 2015
McCullough Cup
Winners: 2013
Runners up: 2014

References

Living people
1997 births
Ireland international men's field hockey players
Male field hockey players from Northern Ireland
Irish male field hockey players
British male field hockey players
2018 Men's Hockey World Cup players
Lisnagarvey Hockey Club players
HC Rotterdam players
KHC Leuven players
Men's Belgian Hockey League players
Men's Irish Hockey League players
Men's Hoofdklasse Hockey players
Male field hockey midfielders
Expatriate field hockey players
Expatriate sportspeople from Northern Ireland in the Netherlands
Sportspeople from County Antrim
People educated at Friends' School, Lisburn
People educated at Wallace High School, Lisburn
Alumni of Queen's University Belfast
La Gantoise HC players